EFG may refer to: 

 EF-G or elongation factor G
 Edge-defined film-fed growth
 Edinburgh Film Guild
 Effective field goal percentage in basketball
 Effingham station, in Illinois, United States
 EFG-Hermes, an Egyptian investment bank
 EFG International, a Swiss banking group
 Electric field gradient
 Enterprise Finance Guarantee
 Efogi Airport, in Papua New Guinea
 European Film Gateway
 Exercise Franchise For Good Governance, in India
 L'est Films Group, a Chinese production company